Strollo is a surname. Notable people with the surname include:

Anthony Strollo (1899–1962), New York mobster
John Strollo (born 1954), American football coach